Podgornoye is a rural locality (a selo) in Bichursky District, Republic of Buryatia, Russia. The population was 28 as of 2010. There is 1 street.

Geography 
Podgornoye is located 55 km west of Bichura (the district's administrative centre) by road. Deben is the nearest rural locality.

References 

Rural localities in Bichursky District